Parikshit Sahni (born 1 January 1944) is an Indian actor who is known for playing the lead in TV series Barrister Vinod, Gul Gulshan Gulfaam (Doordarshan) and Gaatha (Star Plus). He has also appeared in three of Rajkumar Hirani's blockbuster films Lage Raho Munna Bhai, 3 Idiots, and PK.

He is the son of actor Balraj Sahni and nephew of writer Bhisham Sahni.

Early life

He was born in Muree in the Rawalpindi District of the Punjab Province of British India (present day in the Murree District of Punjab, Pakistan), into a Punjabi Hindu family, while his father was teaching English at Visva-Bharati University in Shantiniketan of Rabindranath Tagore, and his mother was doing her Bachelors. Most of his schooling was done at the Lawrence school Sanawar. He then went to study at Delhi's St. Stephen's College. Later, Sahni began his career as a child artist.

Personal life
Sahni's parents were both theatre and film actors, although his mother acted in only a couple of films before her death at an early age in 1947. After her death, his father married Santosh Chandhok two years later.

He is married to Aruna Kapur.

On the advice of his uncle, Bhishm Sahani, Parikshit Sahni was sent by his father to attend a five-year course in architecture in Moscow. However, since he was poor in maths, he was advised to get admission in Cinema Institute. He cleared the aptitude test and joined the five-year course in film direction in the Moscow Cinema Institute. He returned in 1966 and started his film career in India. He assisted Raj Kapoor in Mera Naam Joker because Kapoor needed a person who could help him in working with the Russian Circus but he left that to act in Anokhi Raat.

Sahni even changed his screen name to Ajay Sahni at the suggestion of his friend Sanjeev Kumar during the shooting of their 1968 film Anokhi Raat, before eventually reverting to his own name a few years later.

Career

Sahni starred in the classic Punjabi film Marhi Da Diva (1989), with Raj Babbar, Pankaj Kapur, Kanwaljit Singh, and Deepti Naval. He played a remarkable role in the Hindi film Pavitra Paapi (1970) which was based on a Punjabi novel by Nanak Singh (a famous novelist). Pavitra Paapi also featured his real life father, Balraj Sahni in a pivotal role.

He acted in the Doordarshan television series The Great Maratha as Malhar Rao Holkar.

One of his most famous films was the Amitabh and Shashi Kapoor starer Kaala Patthar.
He acted in the film 3 Idiots in which he played the rolse of R. Madhavan's father. He acted in the TV series Heena as Nawab Mirza, Heena's father. Heena ended in 2003. Sahni played Veer Singh (Kakasa) on the popular Zee TV serial Saat Phere: Saloni Ka Safar opposite Nivedita Bhattacharya.

Filmography

Films

TV series

References

External links
 
 I met a hermit on the run – Article by Parikshit Sahni

Indian male film actors
Indian male television actors
Male actors in Hindi cinema
Living people
Lawrence School, Sanawar alumni
Delhi University alumni
People from Murree
1944 births